Stadtmuller, or Stadtmüller is a surname of German origin, and roughly translated to English means "city miller". It may refer to: 
 Georg Stadtmüller (1909–1935), German historian and Albanologist
 Karl-Heinz Stadtmüller (1953–2008), East German race walker
 Joseph Peter Stadtmueller (born 1942), American lawyer and judge

Other uses 
 Stadtmuller House, San Francisco, California